James Stephen Allen (4 November 1881 – 4 April 1958) was an English first-class cricketer who played for Northamptonshire in 1905 as a left-handed tail-end batsman and a slow left-arm spin bowler. He played in two matches, one of which was the first game played by Northamptonshire in the County Championship.

References

English cricketers
Northamptonshire cricketers
1881 births
1958 deaths
Cricketers from Croydon